Cytochrome c oxidase polypeptide 7A1, mitochondrial is an enzyme that in humans is encoded by the COX7A1 gene.

Cytochrome c oxidase (COX), the terminal component of the mitochondrial respiratory chain, catalyzes the electron transfer from reduced cytochrome c to oxygen. This component is a heteromeric complex consisting of 3 catalytic subunits encoded by mitochondrial genes and multiple structural subunits encoded by nuclear genes. The mitochondrially-encoded subunits function in electron transfer, and the nuclear-encoded subunits may function in the regulation and assembly of the complex. This nuclear gene encodes polypeptide 1 (muscle isoform) of subunit VIIa and the polypeptide 1 is present only in muscle tissues. Other polypeptides of subunit VIIa are present in both muscle and nonmuscle tissues, and are encoded by different genes.

References

External links

Further reading